San Procopio is a comune (municipality) in the Province of Reggio Calabria in the Italian region Calabria, located about  southwest of Catanzaro and about  northeast of Reggio Calabria.

San Procopio borders the following municipalities: Cosoleto, Melicuccà, Oppido Mamertina, Sant'Eufemia d'Aspromonte, Seminara, Sinopoli.

Demographic evolution

References

Cities and towns in Calabria